Eucosmogastra is a genus of moths belonging to the subfamily Olethreutinae of the family Tortricidae.

Species
Eucosmogastra aeolantha (Meyrick, 1914)
Eucosmogastra aeraria (Meyrick, 1909)
Eucosmogastra anthochroa Diakonoff, 1975
Eucosmogastra callicratis (Meyrick, 1909)
Eucosmogastra kontumica Razowski, 2009
Eucosmogastra miltographa (Meyrick, 1907)
Eucosmogastra poetica (Meyrick, 1909)
Eucosmogastra pyrrhopa (Lower, 1896)

See also
List of Tortricidae genera

References

External links
tortricidae.com

Enarmoniini
Tortricidae genera
Taxa named by Alexey Diakonoff